José Pinheiro (born 19 March 1933) is a Portuguese rower. He competed in the men's eight event at the 1952 Summer Olympics.

References

1933 births
Living people
Portuguese male rowers
Olympic rowers of Portugal
Rowers at the 1952 Summer Olympics
Place of birth missing (living people)